The England national futsal team represents England during international futsal competitions such as the FIFA Futsal World Cup and the European Championships. It is under the direction of The Football Association. Although futsal in England has been around for a number of years, the national team was first formed in 2003, after futsal started to gain popularity in 2002.

Home matches are played at various venues around the country. Friendly matches are played with teams from other European nations, and also compete in Four Nations Tournaments each season, along with teams around Europe. England has entered the World Futsal Cup but failed to qualify in 2008. 

In September 2020 the FA cut fundings for futsal and grassroots football. Therefore, the future of the English national futsal team was put into  question.

Competition history

FIFA World Cup

UEFA European Futsal Championship

Minor tournaments

Red border colour indicates tournament was held on home soil.

References

  
England
national